Higueruelas is a municipality in the comarca of Los Serranos in the Valencian Community, Spain. The name in Valencian is Figueroles de Domenyo, but the local language is Spanish, not Valencian.

Further reading 
 Rafael Gil Cortés (Higueruelas, 1952), Higueruelas en tiempos revueltos. República, guerra y represión franquista, Paiporta: Denes, 2016, 360 p.

References

Municipalities in the Province of Valencia
Los Serranos